Robert Charles Speake (born August 22, 1930), nicknamed "Spook", is an American former professional baseball player. He was an outfielder for the Chicago Cubs and San Francisco Giants of Major League Baseball in the 1950s.

References

Living people
1930 births
Major League Baseball outfielders
Chicago Cubs players
San Francisco Giants players
Baseball players from Missouri
Sportspeople from Springfield, Missouri
Missouri State University alumni
Sioux Falls Canaries players
Phoenix Giants players
Springfield Cubs players
Des Moines Bruins players
Los Angeles Angels (minor league) players
Nashville Vols players
Carthage Cubs players